Ekaterina Nikolayevna Tyryshkina (born 31 January 1996) is a Russian professional footballer who plays as a midfielder for French Division 1 Féminine club Dijon and the Russia national team.

Club career
Tyryshkina started her professional career with Kubanochka Krasnodar. On 29 September 2013, she made her professional debut in a 1–2 league defeat against Ryazan. She netted her first goal on 24 April 2015 in a 1–1 draw against Rossiyanka.

Tyryshkina left the club after 2015 season and had short term spells with NiceFutis, Brescia and Rodez in Finland, Italy and France respectively. On 2 September 2018, French top division club Guingamp announced her signing on a two-year deal.

On 6 July 2021, Dijon announced the signing of Tyryshkina for 2021–22 season.

International career
Tyryshkina is a former Russian youth international. She made her senior team debut on 22 October 2015, coming on as a 73rd minute substitute for Daria Makarenko in a 2–0 defeat against Germany during 2017 Euro qualifiers.

References

External links
 

1996 births
Living people
Russian women's footballers
Russia women's international footballers
Women's association football midfielders
Kansallinen Liiga players
Serie A (women's football) players
Division 1 Féminine players
Kubanochka Krasnodar players
NiceFutis players
A.C.F. Brescia Calcio Femminile players
Rodez AF (women) players
En Avant Guingamp (women) players
Expatriate women's footballers in Finland
Expatriate women's footballers in Italy
Expatriate women's footballers in France
People from Angarsk
Sportspeople from Irkutsk Oblast
Russian expatriate women's footballers
21st-century Russian women